Jennifer Joyce (born September 25, 1980 in Vancouver, British Columbia) is a Canadian hammer thrower.

While growing up outside of Vancouver, Joyce excelled in multiple sports as a child. In addition to athletics, she participated in soccer and volleyball, earning a spot on the British Columbia soccer provincial team in 1994. However, her greatest success came in hammer throw, in which she won three national junior titles from 1997 to 1999. As a freshman at the University of California, Berkeley, Joyce continued her success and set a Canadian junior national record of 58.90m. Through the course of her successful career as a Golden Bear, Joyce became a Pac-10 Champion and two NCAA All-American. She also was a four-time qualifier for the NCAA Championships, placing as high as fourth in 2000.

In 2003, her first year as a post-collegiate athlete, Joyce continued to train in California and won her first Canadian senior title. She successfully defended her title in 2004 and 2005 and earned a spot on the Canadian team for the 2005 World Championships. Joyce also set a national record of 68.48 meters that season. She then followed up her successful 2005 season with a silver medal at the 2006 Commonwealth Games.

In 2009, Joyce won her fourth national title and improved her personal best to 70.35m, becoming just the second Canadian to surpass 70 meters.

In addition to throwing, Joyce served as an assistant coach for the University of California's track and field team from 2003 until 2007. During her tenure, she coached several NCAA All-Americans and guided Kelechi Anyanwu to the first NCAA women's discus title in school history. She also coached Amin Nikfar to gold at the 2004 Asian Indoor Championships. Since 2008, she has lived in Kamloops, British Columbia, where she continues to train and also works as a personal trainer.

She currently sits on the Athletics Canada Board of Directors as an Athlete Representative.

Achievements

References

2006 Commonwealth Games profile

1980 births
Canadian female hammer throwers
Athletes (track and field) at the 2003 Pan American Games
Athletes (track and field) at the 2002 Commonwealth Games
Athletes (track and field) at the 2006 Commonwealth Games
Commonwealth Games silver medallists for Canada
Living people
Athletes from Vancouver
Pan American Games track and field athletes for Canada
Commonwealth Games medallists in athletics
Medallists at the 2006 Commonwealth Games